This is a list of the Italian Ministers of Education, University and Research, a position which led the Ministry of Education, University and Research. The last minister was Lorenzo Fioramonti of the Five Star Movement, who was in office until December 2019, when, after his resignation, the ministry was split between Public Education and University and Research.

List of ministers
 Parties:

 Coalitions:

References

Minister of Education
Ministers of Education
Education